Rada is a council in several Slavic countries.
Rada or RADA may also refer to:

People
 Rada (surname)
 Rada (given name)

Places
 Råda, Sweden, a locality
 Rada, West Virginia, United States, an unincorporated community
 Rada Peak, Ellsworth Land, Antarctica

Science and technology
 RadA protein, a recombinase from Archaea homologous to the eukaryotic RAD51 protein
 RADA (Radius Authenticated Device Access), 3Com's proprietary extension of 802.1x authentication
 RADA (Remote Access Discovery Agent), a type of device in the Universal Plug and Play specification

Other uses
 Royal Academy of Dramatic Art (RADA), a drama school in London
 Rada TV, an official television channel of the Ukrainian parliament
 Rada Manufacturing, a United States-based manufacturer of cutlery
 RADA Electronic Industries, an Israeli defence electronics company
 Rajaka, or Rada, a Sri Lankan caste
 Rada (drum), a drum used in the music of Haiti
 Rada (fiqh): a concept from Islamic jurisprudence
 Rada lwa, a family of spirits in Haitian Voduo

See also
 Rada'a District, Yemen
 Citadel of Rada'a
 Radda (disambiguation)